The Penn Club was a private members' club in Bloomsbury in central London. It was established in 1920, and had strong bonds with the Quaker community. It closed in 2021.

While it was affiliated with a private club, anyone was able to rent a room.

Location 
The club was housed in three Georgian houses at 21–23 Bedford Place, just off Russell Square. The Members Club is now situated within the auspices of The Royal Foundation of St. Katharine, 2 Butcher Row, Limehouse, London E14 8DS.

History 
The Penn Club was established in 1920 with surplus funds left over from the Friends Ambulance Unit, active during World War I. The club maintained a considerable collection of books and resources on Quaker traditions and customs.

On 31 January 2021, it was announced that after 101 years, the Club would leave their Bloomsbury premises at the end of March, in response to financial difficulties arising from the coronavirus pandemic. Following this, the Club was invited to become a distinct entity under the auspices of The Royal Foundation of St. Katharine, Limehouse, where it continues to thrive.

Famous residents 
The novelist John Wyndham and his fiancée lived there for several years.

References

External links
 The Penn Club

Clubs and societies in London
1920 establishments in England
Quakerism in England
Quakerism in London